Baldwin Academy is a senior secondary, co-educational, English medium school located in Patna, Bihar, India. It is affiliated to the Central Board of Secondary Education, New Delhi. It was founded in 1987 by Prabhas Kumar and Dr. Rajiv Ranjan Sinha, and is managed by the Baldwin Academy Society. The school was named after Saint Baldwin. It started as primary school and later went on to become a senior secondary school.

The school has been affiliated to the Central Board of Secondary Education, New Delhi since 1997. The principal of the school is Dr. Rajiv Ranjan Sinha, who is also the CBSE city coordinator for Patna.

Administration 
 Principal - Dr. Rajiv Ranjan Sinha
Director - Prabhas Kumar

References

External links 

 Official website

Schools in Patna
High schools and secondary schools in Bihar
Schools in Bihar
Educational institutions established in 1987
1987 establishments in Bihar

Picture Gallery